Bryan Coquard (born 25 April 1992) is a French cyclist, who currently rides for UCI WorldTeam . He was a silver medalist at the 2012 Summer Olympics in the Omnium.

Career

Youth and amateur career
Coquard began cycling in 1999 at the age of seven, at the US Pontchâteau club. In September 2008, aged sixteen, he joined CREPS Bordeaux, where he was coached by Éric Vermeulen.

In 2009, Coquard won the gold medal in the omnium at the UCI Juniors World Championships, as well as winning the scratch at the European championships. He retained his Junior Omnium crown in 2010, winning four of the six events, he also finished second in the Scratch Race. Later that month, he became the omnium champion of France, winning 5 of the 6 races. Following this, he was selected to represent France in the omnium at the 2012 Summer Olympics. He won the silver medal finishing behind Lasse Norman Hansen of Denmark.

Team Europcar
His 2013 campaign began well, as he took two stages in the Étoile de Bessèges in January and February. In 2015, Coquard won the first stage of the Four Days of Dunkirk. The stage featured cobbled sectors, fracturing the peloton to bits, and Coquard won the sprint of a small group of three.

Bryan Coquard began the 2016 season with two victories in the first and second stages of the Étoile de Bessèges. However, on 16 February, in preparation for the Vuelta a Andalucía, he fractured his right shoulder blade. He returned a month later in time for the classics season, having missed his first objective of the year, Paris–Nice. He started off well finishing 2nd behind Jens Debusschere in a small bunch sprint at Dwars door Vlaanderen. After a stage win at the Circuit de la Sarthe, his form continued into the hilly classics of Brabantse Pijl and the Amstel Gold Race finishing fourth in both. In May, he won his first professional stage race at the Four Days of Dunkirk while also winning three stages in the process. The following month, he won his first race against the clock during the prologue of the Boucles de la Mayenne, as well as winning the next stage. In his build up to the Tour de France, he beat Arnaud Démare in the first two stages of the Route du Sud.

Vital Concept
In August 2017 it was confirmed that Coquard had signed for the newly formed  team, as team leader for 2018, shortly after Coquard was excluded from the  Tour de France team. Coquard was also offered a place on the  team, but turned it down as he felt he would be put as 2nd sprinter behind Fernando Gaviria

Coquard made his debut for Vital Concept in January 2018 at the Sharjah International Cycling Tour. He took his first victory in February at stage 1 of the Tour of Oman where he won a sprint finish ahead of Mark Cavendish. Earlier in the month Coquard narrowly missed out on victory at the Étoile de Bessèges, when Christophe Laporte passed him out at the finish line while Coquard was celebrating the victory he had thought he had won.

Cofidis

Major results

Track

2009
 1st  Omnium, UCI World Junior Championships
 UEC European Junior Championships
1st  Scratch
3rd  Team pursuit
2010
 UCI World Junior Championships
1st  Omnium
2nd  Scratch
 UEC European Junior Championships
3rd  Madison (with Romain Le Roux)
3rd  Scratch
3rd  Team pursuit
 National Junior Championships
1st  Individual pursuit
2nd Madison (with Jauffrey Betouigt-Suire)
 2nd Omnium, National Championships
2011
 National Championships
1st  Team pursuit
1st  Scratch
2nd Madison (with Morgan Lamoisson)
 2nd  Omnium, UEC European Championships
2012
 National Championships
1st  Omnium
1st  Madison (with Morgan Lamoisson)
3rd Scratch
 2nd  Omnium, Olympic Games
 UEC European Under-23 Championships
2nd  Omnium
2nd  Points
 2nd Six Days of Grenoble (with Morgan Kneisky)
2013
 UEC European Under-23 Championships
1st  Madison (with Thomas Boudat)
2nd  Scratch
2nd  Team pursuit
2015
 1st  Madison (with Morgan Kneisky), UCI World Championships
 1st  Elimination, UEC European Championships
 National Championships
1st  Madison (with Thomas Boudat)
1st  Team pursuit
2nd Omnium
2019
 UEC European Championships
1st  Points
2nd  Elimination

Road

2010
 2nd  Road race, UEC European Junior Championships
2012
 1st Grand Prix Cristal Energie
 1st Stage 5 Tour de Berlin
 2nd  Road race, UCI World Under-23 Championships
2013
 1st Châteauroux Classic
 Étoile de Bessèges
1st  Points classification
1st Stages 2 & 4
 Tour de Langkawi
1st Stages 8 & 9
 2nd Overall French Cup
1st Young rider classification
 2nd Overall Tour de Picardie
1st Stage 2
 2nd Val d'Ille Classic
 2nd Grand Prix de Denain
 3rd Grand Prix de Fourmies
 5th Paris–Camembert
 5th Boucles de l'Aulne
 6th Tour de Vendée
 8th Grand Prix d'Isbergues
2014
 1st Route Adélie
 1st Paris–Camembert
 Étoile de Bessèges
1st Stages 3 & 4
 3rd Overall Tour de Picardie
1st Stage 1
2015
 Route du Sud
1st  Points classification
1st Stages 2 & 4
 1st Stage 3 Étoile de Bessèges
 2nd Overall Four Days of Dunkirk
1st  Points classification
1st  Young rider classification
1st Stage 1
 4th Overall Tour de Picardie
 4th Grand Prix de Plumelec-Morbihan
 4th Brussels Cycling Classic
 5th Trofeo Playa de Palma
 5th Grand Prix de la Somme
 9th Trofeo Santanyi-Ses Salines-Campos
 10th Grand Prix de Denain
2016
 1st  Overall Four Days of Dunkirk
1st  Points classification
1st  Young rider classification
1st Stages 1, 2 & 3
 1st  Overall Boucles de la Mayenne
1st  Points classification
1st Prologue & Stage 2
 1st Route Adélie
 Étoile de Bessèges
1st  Points classification
1st Stages 1 & 2
 Route du Sud
1st Stages 1 & 2
 1st Stage 2a Circuit de la Sarthe
 2nd Dwars door Vlaanderen
 3rd Grand Prix de Fourmies
 3rd Tour de Vendée
 4th Brabantse Pijl
 4th Clásica de Almería
 4th Amstel Gold Race
 5th Paris–Tours
 6th Grand Prix d'Isbergues
2017
 Circuit de la Sarthe
1st  Points classification
1st Stages 2a & 4
 1st Stage 4 Vuelta a Andalucía
 1st Stage 5 Volta a la Comunitat Valenciana
 1st Stage 1 Tour of Belgium
2018
 1st Stage 1 Tour of Oman
 1st Stage 4 Four Days of Dunkirk
 2nd Paris–Bourges
 7th Overall Sharjah International Cycling Tour
 7th Overall Tour of Belgium
1st Stage 5
2019
 1st Grand Prix Pino Cerami
 1st Grote Prijs Marcel Kint
 1st  Points classification, Tour de Wallonie
 Circuit de la Sarthe
1st  Points classification
1st Stage 2
 1st Stage 1 Étoile de Bessèges
 1st Stage 2 Arctic Race of Norway
 1st Stage 4 Four Days of Dunkirk
 2nd Cholet-Pays de la Loire
 3rd Overall Boucles de la Mayenne
1st Stage 3
 3rd Tour de Vendée
 5th Grand Prix de Plumelec-Morbihan
 5th Grand Prix d'Isbergues
 6th La Roue Tourangelle
 7th Overall Tour of Belgium
1st Stage 5
 8th Paris–Chauny
2020
 1st Stage 1 Route d'Occitanie
 2nd Road race, National Championships
 3rd Scheldeprijs
2021
 2nd Grand Prix du Morbihan
 3rd Grand Prix La Marseillaise
 4th Overall Boucles de la Mayenne
 5th Paris–Bourges
 6th Paris–Tours
2022
 1st Stage 2 Tour de la Provence
 1st Stage 2 Étoile de Bessèges
 2nd La Roue Tourangelle
 3rd Paris–Bourges
 6th Grand Prix La Marseillaise
 7th Omloop van het Houtland
 10th Circuit Franco–Belge
2023
 10th Overall Tour Down Under
1st Stage 4

Grand Tour general classification results timeline

References

External links
 
 
 
 
 
 
 
 

1992 births
Living people
French male cyclists
French track cyclists
Olympic cyclists of France
Olympic silver medalists for France
Olympic medalists in cycling
Cyclists at the 2012 Summer Olympics
Medalists at the 2012 Summer Olympics
Knights of the Ordre national du Mérite
Sportspeople from Saint-Nazaire
Cyclists from Loire-Atlantique